Ruth ( rut) is a common female given name, noted from Ruth, the eponymous heroine of the eighth book of the Old Testament.

History of usage
Not evidently in regular usage among the ancient Hebrews, the name of the Biblical figure Ruth is generally equated with the Hebraic רְעוּת (re'ut): companion, which meaning accords with the character of the Biblical Ruth, who, despite being widowed, chooses to remain with her mother-in-law Naomi (to whom Ruth speaks the iconic quote: "Whither thou goest, I will go.") 

Ruth first occurs as a given name in Europe and the British Isles at the time of the Reformation, prior to which the occurrence of Biblical names – unless borne by saints – was unusual.

Although Puritans generally disfavored Biblical proper names, they seemingly made an exception for Ruth, as it could be interpreted as a virtue name via equation with ruth, a then-common noun (Germanic in origin) which overall meant sorrow but which could be interpreted as compassion: Ruth therefore was brought by the Pilgrims to English-speaking North America where overall the name has been more popular than in the British Isles, although the name Ruth has been markedly more popular in Ireland than in Britain.

Ranked at No. 46 on the 1890 tally of the most popular names for American newborn girls, the name Ruth showed a sharp increase in popularity on the respective 1891 tally with a ranking at No. 19 while the tallies for the years 1892 and 1893 ranked the popularity of the name Ruth at respectively No. 5 and No. 3. The impetus for the boost in the popularity of the name Ruth was the 3 October 1891 birth of Ruth Cleveland daughter of (then former) US president Grover Cleveland and his wife Frances Cleveland, the latter herself a celebrity due to her 2 June 1886 marriage – she remains the youngest first lady and the only one wed at the White House – after which she had proven a very popular first lady. Although Grover Cleveland lost the 1888 presidential election to Benjamin Harrison the victor proved very unpopular, and by 1891 the American public overwhelmingly regarded the return to presidential office of Grover Cleveland – and therefore Frances' return as first lady – as being inevitable (Grover Cleveland was indeed re-elected president in an 1892 landslide victory). The birth of the Clevelands' first child, Ruth, therefore ranked as front-page news, with press mentions of "Baby Ruth" occurring regularly throughout Ruth Cleveland's infancy and toddler period.

The name Ruth retained a Top Ten ranking in the yearly tallies of the most popular names for American newborn girls until after 1930, remaining in the Top 20 until after 1937 and in the Top 50 until after 1950. Typically for traditional one-syllable girls names, the popularity of the name Ruth for American newborns has decreased since the mid-20th century with the name last ranking in the Top 100 in 1961, being then at No. 96. The tally of most popular names for newborn American girls for the year 2014 ranks the name Ruth at No. 314.

Variants

People with the given name

Fictional characters
 Ruth, a character in the 1992 TV comedy Revenge of the Nerds III
 Ruth (dragon), dragon in Anne McCaffrey's Dragonriders of Pern novels
 Ruth Brenner, a therapist in Russian Doll (TV series)
 Ruth DeWitt Bukater, an antagonist in Titanic (1997 film)
 Ruthie Camden, on 7th Heaven, the WB/CW (1996–2007) family drama
 Ruth Dunbar, a character in the American television sitcom Bosom Buddies
 Ruth Galloway, archaeologist and protagonist of a series of novels by Elly Griffiths
 Ruth Hilton, central character in 1853 novel Ruth (novel)
 Ruth Jamison, in Fried Green Tomatoes at the Whistle Stop Cafe, portrayed in the 1991 film adaptation by Mary-Louise Parker
 Ruthie Lombard, six year old protagonist of the One Big Happy daily comic strip
 Ruth Pearce, from the British soap opera Doctors, portrayed by Selina Chilton
 Ruth Shandling, a character in the American sitcom It's Garry Shandling's Show
 Ruth "Rudi" Smith, from the British sitcom Gavin & Stacey, portrayed by Sheridan Smith
 Ruth Ann "Ruthie" Smithens, in American Girl's Kit Kittredge series

Notes

Feminine given names
English given names
English feminine given names
Hebrew feminine given names
Lists of people by given name